Thomas Jensen Orloff is an American lawyer. He is the former district attorney for Alameda County, California.

Orloff began work in the DA's office after graduating from the University of California, Berkeley for law in 1970, trying 25 murder cases before becoming Chief Assistant DA in 1989. When District Attorney Jack Meehan retired in 1994, Orloff ran unopposed for the position, and was reelected in unopposed elections in 1998, 2002, and 2006.  On September 8, 2009, Orloff announced his intention to retire. He retired on September 18, 2009.

Orloff's grandfather was a mayor of Pleasanton, where Orloff was born.

Orloff's office found itself in the middle of controversy in early 2009 over its pending decision whether to charge a crime in the BART Police shooting of Oscar Grant. Though Orloff charged Johannes Mehserle with murder, some activists complained that he took too long to do so.  Criminal law expert and Boalt Hall Law School Professor Franklin Zimring, however, called Orloff's office one of the "better departments" in the United States.

Orloff unsuccessfully prosecuted the Oakland Riders police abuse case, dropping charges after two mistrials from hung juries.

References

External links
 "Meet the DA" webpage

District attorneys in California
UC Berkeley School of Law alumni
Living people
Year of birth missing (living people)
People from Pleasanton, California